The 2012 Tennessee State Tigers football team represented Tennessee State University as a member of the a member of the Ohio Valley Conference (OVC) in the 2012 NCAA Division I FCS football season. They were led by third-year head coach Rod Reed and played their home games at LP Field and Hale Stadium. Tennessee State finished the season 8–3 overall and 4–3 in OVC play to place fifth.

Schedule

References

Tennessee State
Tennessee State Tigers football seasons
Tennessee State Tigers football